{{Speciesbox
| name = Elegant spider orchid
| image = 
| image_caption = 
| status_system = EPBC
| status = CR
| genus = Caladenia
| species = elegans
| authority = Hopper & A.P.Br.
| synonyms_ref = 
| synonyms = {{collapsible list |
 Caladenia elegans N.Hoffman & A.P.Br. nom. inval.
 Caladenia elegans Anon. nom. inval., nom. nud.
 Caladenia elegans Paczk. & A.R.Chapm. nom. inval.
 Caladenia sp. (Northampton) S.D.Hopper 3347 
 Caladenia sp. 9 (Northampton) 
 Caladenia sp. Muir (S.D.Hopper 3521) p.p.
 Calonema elegans (Hopper & A.P.Br.) D.L.Jones & M.A.Clem. 
 Calonemorchis elegans (Hopper & A.P.Br.) D.L.Jones & M.A.Clem. 
 Jonesiopsis elegans (Hopper & A.P.Br.) D.L.Jones & M.A.Clem.
}}
}}Caladenia elegans,  commonly known as the elegant spider orchid, is a species of orchid endemic to a small area near the coast of the south-west of Western Australia. It resembles the common spider orchid (C. vulgata) and often grows with it but its flowers are a different colour and C. elegans usually grows in poorly-drained soils. Only about 2,300 plants remained in 2016.

 Description Caladenia elegans is a terrestrial, perennial deciduous herb with an underground tuber and which often grows in clumps of up to eight or more plants.

The sepals and petals taper to long thread-like, dark-coloured, drooping tips. The edges of the labellum have short, broad teeth and there are two rows of glossy yellow calli along its centre. Flowering occurs from July to August.

This species is similar to C. vulgata but differs in having lemon-yellow flowers and glossy yellow calli. The two species hybridise in a few places.

 Taxonomy and naming Caladenia elegans was first described by Stephen Hopper and Andrew Brown in 2001 from a specimen collected by Hopper near Northampton in 1983. The description was published in Nuytsia. The specific epithet (elegans) is a Latin word meaning "elegant" referring to "the attractive flowers".

 Distribution and habitat 
Elegant spider orchid is only known from near Northhampton where it grows in clay soils that are wet in winter, often near dense, low shrubs in the Geraldton Sandplains biogeographic region. (C. vulgata tends to grow in drier, better-drained soils.)

ConservationCaladenia elegans is listed as "Threatened" in Western Australia under the Biodiversity Conservation Act 2016. Only about 2300 plants remained in 18 populations in a 2016 survey. The main threats to the species are weed invasion and grazing and trampling by pigs and rabbits. It is also classed as "Critically Endangered" under the Commonwealth Government Environment Protection and Biodiversity Conservation Act 1999'' (EPBC) Act.

References 

elegans
Orchids of Western Australia
Endemic orchids of Australia
Plants described in 2001
Endemic flora of Western Australia
Taxa named by Andrew Phillip Brown